"Mr. & Mrs. Smith" is an original song introduced in the third episode of the first season of the musical TV series Smash, entitled "Enter Mr. DiMaggio". It was written by Marc Shaiman and Scott Wittman, but within the show's universe, it was written by the songwriting team of Tom Levitt (Christian Borle) and Julia Houston (Debra Messing) for the Bombshell musical they are working on about Marilyn Monroe.

In "Enter Mr. DiMaggio", the setting has Ivy Lynn (Megan Hilty) and Michael Swift (Will Chase) recording the song in a recording studio, while the show cuts away to a fantasy of Lynn and Swift as Marilyn Monroe and Joe DiMaggio singing the song as a ballad in front of an idealized version of a little house with a white picket fence and their desire to be a normal couple without fame.

The song is also sung in the fourteenth episode of the first season, Previews, by Swift and Rebecca Duvall (Uma Thurman), and in the fifteenth episode of the season, Bombshell, by Swift and Karen Cartwright (Katharine McPhee).

The song was originally released as a single on iTunes and Amazon.com's MP3 story and is currently a track on the cast albums The Music of Smash and Bombshell, with the Hilty and Chase version for the vocals.

Critical reception
In their review of the cast album The Music of Smash, theatermania.com said of this song, "Will Chase and Hilty complement each other marvelously on the original songs "Mr. and Mrs. Smith," which they deliver with charmingly romantic delicacy..."

References

Songs written by Marc Shaiman
Songs written by Scott Wittman
2012 songs
Songs from Smash (TV series)